The West Country whipping is a quick practical whipping knot, a method of using twine to secure the end of a rope to prevent it fraying.  It has several advantages: it can be tied without a needle; it is simple to understand and remember; if the whipping fails, the loose ends can usually be re-tied to temporarily prevent the rope's end from fraying.

Technique 
Half knots are tied alternately behind and in front of the rope until the width of the band of twine approaches the diameter of the rope.  A reef (square) knot, or better a series of reef (square) knots, completes the whipping.  If a needle is available this string of reef (square) knots can be pulled through the rope to bury the ends.  Alternatively, a short bight of another rope can be laid first and used to pull the rope ends through.  If the rope is a stranded rope, the ends can usually be pulled through without a needle.

Alternatives 

The sailmaker's whipping is the yardstick for comparison, for its durability. There are two approaches to forming the frapping turns, the source of the durability, both of which are harder to understand and remember compared to the West Country whipping.

See also
List of knots

References

External links